El Víbora (Spanish: The Viper) was a Spanish language monthly alternative comics magazine published in Barcelona, Spain, between 1979 and 2005, with a peak monthly circulation of 80,000 copies. The magazine was subtitled "Comix for Survivors".

History and profile
El Víbora was established in December 1979. The founders were a group of Spanish cartoonists led by Josep Maria Berenguer. Catalan comics publisher Josep Toutain financed the establishment of the magazine which was published by La Cúpula.

Josep Maria Berenguer wanted to name the magazine as GOMA 3, a reference to Goma-2, an explosive notoriously used by the Basque terrorist/nationalist organization ETA during the 1970s. However, the name was rejected by the Spanish authorities.

El Víbora was published monthly and had its headquarters in Barcelona. The contributors included not only Spanish but also French and American authors, including Peter Bagge, Robert Crumb and Charles Burns. Native contributors were Max, Nazario, Mariscal and Pons. Of them, Max created the characters of Gustavo, Peter Pank, Gallardo and Mediavilla. Hernán Migoya served as the editor-in-chief of the magazine from 1992 to 1998. The last editor was Sergi Puertas.

El Víbora sold 45,000 copies in 1983. Its circulation was 6,000 copies in 2004 just before its last issue in January 2005. The magazine ran over 300 issues during its existence.

During the COVID-19 pandemic, the magazine was revived online, free of charge, as El Víbora para supervivientes (~ for survivors) for the duration of the lockdown in Spain. It contained mostly material from the original issues plus articles about coronavirus, with a cover about COVID-19. This revival lasted for six weekly issues.

See also
 List of magazines in Spain
 Spanish comics

References

1979 comics debuts
2005 comics endings
1979 establishments in Spain
2005 disestablishments in Spain
Alternative magazines
Comics magazines published in Spain
Defunct magazines published in Spain
Magazines established in 1979
Magazines disestablished in 2005
Magazines published in Barcelona
Monthly magazines published in Spain
Spanish-language magazines